Aado Lintrop (born 9 June 1956, Tallinn) is an Estonian poet, religious researcher and folklorist.

He graduated from the University of Tartu with a degree in Estonian and Finno-Ugric philology in 1995. The same year, he also received a master's degree in Estonian and comparative folklore.  He received his doctorate from the University of Tartu in 2000 in Estonian and comparative folklore. From 1979 until 1990, he worked at Estonian National Museum. Since 2000, he has been working at the Estonian Literary Museum.

From 2004 to 2005, he was the head of Estonian Literary Museum's Estonian Folklore Archives.

Selected works
 1985: poetry collection "Asuja"
 2000: poetry collection "Sõnaristi"
 2010: poetry collection "Annapurna"
 2011: poetry collection "Nights Ride into My Yard"

References

Living people
1956 births
Estonian male poets
20th-century Estonian poets
21st-century Estonian poets
University of Tartu alumni
Academic staff of the University of Tartu
Estonian folklorists
Writers from Tallinn
People from Tallinn